Bhopawar Agency was a sub-agency of the Central India Agency in British India with the headquarters at the town of Bhopawar, so the name. Bhopawar Agency was created in 1882 from a number of princely states in the Western Nimar and Southern Malwa regions of Central India belonging to the former Bhil Agency and Bhil Sub-agency with the capitals at Bhopawar and Manpur. The agency was named after Bhopawar, a village in Sardarpur tehsil, Dhar District of present-day Madhya Pradesh state. Manpur remained a strictly British territory.

The other chief towns of this region were: Badnawar, Kukshi, Manawar and Sardarpur, Chadawad Estate, Dattigaon. The mighty Vindhya and Satpura ranges crossed the territory of the agency roughly from east to west, with the fertile valley of the Narmada River lying between them. The agency also included the "Bhil Country", inhabited by the Bhil people.

History 
 
In 1925 Bhopawar Agency was merged into Malwa Agency, and in 1927 the agency was renamed the Malwa-Bhopawar States Agency, which was renamed again as the Malwa Agency in 1934.

After Indian Independence in 1947, the rulers of the princely states within Malwa-Bhopawar Agency acceded to the Union of India, and the region became part of the new state of Madhya Bharat. Madhya Bharat was merged into Madhya Pradesh on 1 November 1956.

Princely states and their feudatory estates

Salute States 
Salute states in the agency, by precedence, with their feudatories :
 Dhar, title Maharaja, Hereditary salute of 15-guns
 Alirajpur, title Raja, Hereditary salute of 11-guns
 including the extinct State of Phulmaal, which was incorporated into it earlier as well as Fiefs (Jagirs) 
 Ondhwa 
 Sondhwa.
 Barwani, title Maharana, Hereditary salute of 11-guns
Jhabua, title Raja, Hereditary salute of 11-guns (till 1927, later shifted to (Malwa Agency)

Non-salute states 
Minor and petty Princely states in the agency included (alphabetically, with their feudatories) :
 Amjhera, title Rao
 Bakhatgarh
 Chhadawad, title Rao
Jobat, title Raja
 Kathiwara, title Thakur
 Mathwar, title Rana
 Multhan.                            
 Ratanmal, title Thakur.
 in Indore State Territory's few enclaves like - Petlawad Tehsil, Dahi Jagir etc.
 also including around about seventeen Feudal lords (Jagirdars) who paid direct tribute to Indore Durbar .

Further estates, not named above, include :

References

External links and Sources 
 Dictionaries of South Asia Library, Chicago University

Agencies of British India
Historical Indian regions
History of Madhya Pradesh
1882 establishments in India
1947 disestablishments in India

de:Central India Agency#Bhopawar Agency